Vale School District 84 is a school district headquartered in Vale, Oregon.

The Vale School District takes students from Vale and Brogan, as well as the unincorporated community of Willowcreek. Vale High School also takes high school students from Juntura.

History
In 1967 there were plans to remodel the former high school.

In July 2021 the superintendent opposed mandatory mask mandates imposed by the Oregon state government during the COVID-19 pandemic in Oregon. However in August the district required face coverings and the superintendent expressed concern regarding COVID-19 in the area. The superintendent stated that she would prefer that in-person instruction remain.

Schools
 Vale High School (9-12)
 Willowcreek Elementary School (1-8)
 Vale Middle School (7-8)
 Vale Elementary School (K-6)

References

External links
 

Education in Malheur County, Oregon
School districts in Oregon